Chor Police may refer to:
Chor Police, a 1983 Indian film
Chor Police (game), a pastime role-playing game
Chorr Police, an Indian animation comedy show
Chor Sipahee, 1977 Indian film